Ultimate Fighting Championship is the first video game based on the Ultimate Fighting Championship mixed martial arts tournament. It was first developed by Anchor Inc. for the Sega Dreamcast on August 29, 2000, then by Opus for the Sony PlayStation on November 13 the same year, and finally by Fluid Studios for the Game Boy Color on November 27 the same year. All three versions of the game were published by Crave Entertainment in North America, while Ubi Soft published the three versions in Europe and Capcom publishing the PlayStation and Dreamcast versions in Japan.

Fighters 

 Mikey Burnett
 Mark Coleman
 Gary Goodridge
 Jeremy Horn
 Matt Hughes
 Eugene Jackson
 Tsuyoshi Kosaka
 Tim Lajcik
 Chuck Liddell
 Guy Mezger
 Pat Miletich
 Tito Ortiz
 Kevin Randleman
 Marco Ruas
 Bas Rutten
 Pedro Rizzo
 Andre Roberts
 Frank Shamrock
 Maurice Smith
 Evan Tanner
 Ron Waterman
 Pete Williams

Reception

The Dreamcast version received "generally favorable reviews", just two points shy of "universal acclaim", while the PlayStation version received "mixed" reviews, according to the review aggregation website Metacritic. Dan Morris of NextGen said of the former console version in its October 2000 issue, "No-holds-barred fighting gets a world-class Dreamcast translation, with gameplay that's both lifelike and exciting." Five issues later, however, Daniel Erickson said in his review of the latter console version, "If Ultimate Fighting Championship had first appeared on PlayStation, we might have been more impressed with its originality and more likely to overlook some of its glaring flaws. After the excellent Dreamcast version, however, all we can see is how much worse this PlayStation outing is." Edge, however, gave the former console version four out of ten, saying, "Lacking in the humour of WWF's absurd pantomime, Crave's title occupies an alien middle ground that can be difficult to digest, and even with its supposed plethora of moves, it's hard to develop any attachment. While it's obvious why shortsighted codeshops will never go wrong appealing to the lowest common denominator, you have to wonder whether titles based on moral ground as shaky as this are actually worthy of featuring anything innovative anyway." In Japan, where both the Dreamcast and PlayStation versions were ported and published by Capcom on January 25, 2001, Famitsu gave it a score of 32 out of 40 for the former console version, and 24 out of 40 for the latter one.

The Dreamcast version was a runner-up for GameSpots annual "Best Dreamcast Game" and "Best Sports Game (Alternative)" awards, both of which went to NFL 2K1 and Tony Hawk's Pro Skater 2. Conversely, the PlayStation version was nominated in the "Most Disappointing Game" and "Worst Game" categories among console titles; the staff dubbed it "a pixellated, stiffly playing abomination." The Dreamcast version was a finalist for the Academy of Interactive Arts & Sciences' 2000 "Console Fighting Game of the Year" award, which went to Dead or Alive 2.

See also

List of fighting games

Notes

References

External links

2000 video games
Capcom games
Dreamcast games
Game Boy Color games
PlayStation (console) games
Ubisoft games
Ultimate Fighting Championship video games
Video games developed in Japan